Maeve McLaughlin (born 24 September 1968) is an Irish Sinn Féin politician who was a  Member of the Northern Ireland Assembly (MLA) for Foyle from 2012 to 2016. 

She was chosen to replace Martina Anderson, and took office in June 2012.

She previously sat on Derry City Council, having been elected in 2001. She received a BA (with honours) in Sociology, History and Politics, and was active in politics during her time at University College Galway.

McLaughlin lost her seat in the 2016 Assembly election.

References

1968 births
Living people
Sinn Féin MLAs
Northern Ireland MLAs 2011–2016
Female members of the Northern Ireland Assembly
Councillors in Derry (city)
Alumni of the University of Galway
Sinn Féin councillors in Northern Ireland
Women councillors in Northern Ireland